Calamaria albiventer is a species of snake in the family Colubridae . It is found in parts of Peninsular Malaysia, possibly Singapore, and in Sumatra, Indonesia.

References

Calamaria
Reptiles of Indonesia
Reptiles of the Malay Peninsula
Reptiles of Singapore
Taxa named by John Edward Gray
Reptiles described in 1835